Taylor Business Institute Chicago is a private for-profit career college in Chicago, Illinois. It was founded in 1962 and awards associate degrees and certificates.

History
Taylor Business Institute has been operating in the Chicago Loop since 1962.  From 1962 to 1986, the college was primarily a diploma-focused institute offering women clerk typist and secretarial training and was owned by ITT Educational Services. In 1986, Janice Parker, the former director of the school, acquired the college.

Academics 
The institution offers associate degrees, diplomas, and certificates. It is accredited by the Higher Learning Commission (HLC) to award Associate of Applied Science degrees and a Certificate. It is also approved and licensed by the Division of Private Business and Vocational Schools of the Illinois Board of Higher Education under the state’s Private Business and Vocational Schools Act and Academic Degree Act.

References

External links
Official website

For-profit universities and colleges in the United States
Educational institutions established in 1962
1962 establishments in Illinois
Universities and colleges in Chicago
Private universities and colleges in Illinois